is a passenger railway station in located in the city of Higashiōsaka,  Osaka Prefecture, Japan, operated by the private railway operator Kintetsu Railway.

Lines
Nagase Station is served by the Osaka Line, and is located 6.2 rail kilometers from the starting point of the line at Ōsaka Uehommachi Station.

Station layout
The station consists of two ground-level side platforms. There is no interconnection between the platforms; passengers wishing to change platforms must exit the station, cross via an underground passage, and re-enter from the opposite side.

Platforms

Adjacent stations

History
Nagase Station opened on October 31, 1924.

Passenger statistics
In fiscal 2018, the station was used by an average of 30,889 passengers daily.

Surrounding area
Kindai University

See also
List of railway stations in Japan

References

External links

 Nagase Station 

Railway stations in Japan opened in 1924
Railway stations in Osaka Prefecture
Higashiōsaka